Laguna's 3rd congressional district is one of the seven congressional districts of the Philippines in the province of Laguna. It has been represented in the House of Representatives of the Philippines since 1987. The district consists of the city of San Pablo and adjacent municipalities of Alaminos, Calauan, Liliw, Nagcarlan, Rizal and Victoria. It is currently represented in the 19th Congress by Loreto S. Amante of the PDP–Laban.

Representation history

Election results

1995

1998

2001

2004

2007

2010

2013

2016

2019

2022

See also
Legislative districts of Laguna

References

Congressional districts of the Philippines
Politics of Laguna (province)
1987 establishments in the Philippines
Congressional districts of Calabarzon
Constituencies established in 1987